Located in the eastern part of Canada, and (from a historical and political perspective) part of Central Canada, Quebec occupies a territory nearly three times the size of France or Texas, and is much closer to the size of Alaska. As is the case with Alaska, most of the land in Quebec is very sparsely populated. Its topography is very different from one region to another due to the varying composition of the ground, the climate (latitude and altitude), and the proximity to water. The Great Lakes–St. Lawrence Lowlands and the Appalachians are the two main topographic regions in southern Quebec, while the Canadian Shield occupies most of central and northern Quebec.

More than 90% of Quebec's area lies within the Canadian Shield, and includes the greater part of the Labrador Peninsula. Quebec's highest mountain is Mont D'Iberville, which is located on the border with Newfoundland and Labrador in the northeastern part of the province in the Torngat Mountains. The addition of parts of the vast and scarcely populated District of Ungava of the Northwest Territories between 1898 and 1912 gave the province its current form.

The territory of Quebec is extremely rich in resources in its coniferous forests, lakes, and rivers—pulp and paper, lumber, and hydroelectricity are still some of the province's most important industries. The far north of the province, Nunavik, is subarctic or Arctic and is mostly inhabited by Inuit.

The most populous region is the Saint Lawrence River valley in the south, where the capital, Quebec City, and the largest city, Montreal, are situated. North of Montreal are the Laurentians, a range of ancient mountains, and to the east are the Appalachian Mountains which extends into the Eastern Townships and Gaspésie regions. The Gaspé Peninsula juts into the Gulf of Saint Lawrence to the East. The Saint Lawrence River Valley is a fertile agricultural region, producing dairy products, fruit, vegetables, maple sugar (Quebec is the world's largest producer of maple syrup), and livestock.

Borders
Quebec is bordered by the province of Ontario, James Bay and Hudson Bay (including the circular Nastapoka arc) to the west, the provinces of New Brunswick and Newfoundland and Labrador to the east and Hudson Strait and Ungava Bay to the north. Its northernmost point is Cape Wolstenholme. Quebec also shares a land border with four northeast states of the United States (Maine, New Hampshire, New York and Vermont) to the south. 

In 1927, the border between the Province of Quebec and the Dominion of Newfoundland was delineated by the British Judicial Committee of the Privy Council. The government of Quebec does not officially recognize the Newfoundland and Labrador–Quebec border. A border dispute remains regarding the ownership of Labrador. A maritime boundary also exists with the territories of Nunavut, Prince Edward Island and Nova Scotia. Half of these are land limits, 12% river limits and 38% marine limits.

Topography

About a hundred million years ago, the area of southern Quebec was over the New England hotspot, creating the magma intrusions of the Monteregian Hills. These intrusive stocks have been variously interpreted as the feeder intrusions of long extinct volcanoes, which would have been active about 125 million years ago, or as intrusives that have never broken the surface in volcanic activity.

The most populous physiographic region is the Great Lakes–St. Lawrence Lowlands. It extends northeastward from the southwestern portion of the province along the shores of the Saint Lawrence River to the Quebec City region, limited to the North by the Laurentian Mountains and to the South by the Appalachians. It mainly covers the areas of the Centre-du-Québec, Laval, Montérégie and Montreal, the southern regions of the Capitale-Nationale, Lanaudière, Laurentides, Mauricie and includes Anticosti Island, the Mingan Archipelago, and other small islands of the Gulf of St. Lawrence lowland forests ecoregion. Its landscape is low-lying and flat, except for isolated igneous outcrops near Montreal called the Monteregian Hills, formerly covered by the waters of Lake Champlain. The Oka hills also rise from the plain. Geologically, the lowlands formed as a rift valley about 100 million years ago and are prone to infrequent but significant earthquakes. The most recent layers of sedimentary rock were formed as the seabed of the ancient Champlain Sea at the end of the last ice age about 14,000 years ago. The combination of rich and easily arable soils and Quebec's relatively warm climate makes this valley the most prolific agricultural area of Quebec province. Mixed forests provide most of Canada's springtime maple syrup crop. The rural part of the landscape is divided into narrow rectangular tracts of land that extend from the river and date back to settlement patterns in 17th century New France.

More than 95% of Quebec's territory lies within the Canadian Shield. It is generally a quite flat and exposed mountainous terrain interspersed with higher points such as the Laurentian Mountains in southern Quebec, the Otish Mountains in central Quebec and the Torngat Mountains near Ungava Bay. The topography of the Shield has been shaped by glaciers from the successive ice ages, which explains the glacial deposits of boulders, gravel and sand, and by sea water and post-glacial lakes that left behind thick deposits of clay in parts of the Shield. The Canadian Shield also has a complex hydrological network of perhaps a million lakes, bogs, streams and rivers. It is rich in the forestry, mineral and hydro-electric resources that are a mainstay of the Quebec economy. Primary industries sustain small cities in regions of Abitibi-Témiscamingue, Saguenay–Lac-Saint-Jean, and Côte-Nord.

The Labrador Peninsula is covered by the Laurentian Plateau (or Canadian Shield), dotted with mountains such as Otish Mountains. The Ungava Peninsula is notably composed of D'Youville mountains, Puvirnituq mountains and Pingualuit crater. While low and medium altitude peak from western Quebec to the far north, high altitudes mountains emerge in the Capitale-Nationale region to the extreme east, along its longitude. In the Labrador Peninsula portion of the Shield, the far northern region of Nunavik includes the Ungava Peninsula and consists of flat Arctic tundra inhabited mostly by the Inuit. Further south lie the subarctic taiga of the Eastern Canadian Shield taiga ecoregion and the boreal forest of the Central Canadian Shield forests, where spruce, fir, and poplar trees provide raw materials for Quebec's pulp and paper and lumber industries. Although the area is inhabited principally by the Cree, Naskapi, and Innu First Nations, thousands of temporary workers reside at Radisson to service the massive James Bay Hydroelectric Project on the La Grande and Eastmain rivers. The southern portion of the shield extends to the Laurentians, a mountain range just north of the Great Lakes–St. Lawrence Lowlands, that attracts local and international tourists to ski hills and lakeside resorts.

The Appalachian region of Quebec has a narrow strip of ancient mountains along the southeastern border of Quebec. The Appalachians are actually a huge chain that extends from Alabama to Newfoundland. In between, it covers in Quebec near , from the Montérégie hills to the Gaspé Peninsula.

Hydrography

Quebec has several notable islands, namely the numerous islands of the Hochelaga Archipelago that includes the Island of Montreal and Îles Laval which make up full or parts of the major cities of Montreal and Laval. Île d'Orléans near Quebec City, the sparsely populated Anticosti Island in the outlet of the Saint Lawrence River, and the Magdalen Islands archipelago in the Gulf of Saint Lawrence are other noteworthy islands.

Quebec has one of the world's largest reserves of fresh water, occupying 12% of its surface. It has 3% of the world's renewable fresh water, whereas it has only 0.1% of its population. The largest inland body of water is the Caniapiscau Reservoir, created in the realization of the James Bay Project to produce hydroelectric power. Lake Mistassini is the largest natural lake in Quebec.

The Saint Lawrence River has some of the world's largest sustaining inland Atlantic ports at Montreal (the province's largest city), Trois-Rivières, and Quebec City (the capital). Its access to the Atlantic Ocean and the interior of North America made it the base of early French exploration and settlement in the 17th and 18th centuries. Since 1959, the Saint Lawrence Seaway has provided a navigable link between the Atlantic Ocean and the Great Lakes. Northeast of Quebec City, the river broadens into the world's largest estuary, the feeding site of numerous species of whales, fish, and seabirds. The river empties into the Gulf of Saint Lawrence. This marine environment sustains fisheries and smaller ports in the Lower Saint Lawrence (Bas-Saint-Laurent), Lower North Shore (Côte-Nord), and Gaspé (Gaspésie) regions of the province. The Saint Lawrence River with its estuary forms the basis of Quebec's development through the centuries. Other notable rivers include the Ashuapmushuan, Chaudière, Gatineau, Manicouagan, Ottawa, Richelieu, Rupert, Saguenay, Saint-François, and Saint-Maurice.

Climate

In general, the climate of Quebec is cold and humid. The climate of the province is largely determined by its latitude, maritime and elevation influences. According to the Köppen climate classification, Quebec has three main climate regions. Southern and western Quebec, including most of the major population centres and areas south of 51oN, have a humid continental climate (Köppen climate classification Dfb) with four distinct seasons having warm to occasionally hot and humid summers and often very cold and snowy winters. 

The main climatic influences are from western and northern Canada and move eastward, and from the southern and central United States that move northward. During the summer, severe weather patterns (such as tornadoes and severe thunderstorms) occur occasionally. Most of central Quebec, ranging from 51 to 58 degrees North has a subarctic climate (Köppen Dfc). Winters are long, very cold, and snowy, and among the coldest in eastern Canada, while summers are warm but very short due to the higher latitude and the greater influence of Arctic air masses. Precipitation is also somewhat less than farther south, except at some of the higher elevations. The northern regions of Quebec have an arctic climate (Köppen ET), with very cold winters and short, much cooler summers. The primary influences in this region are the Arctic Ocean currents (such as the Labrador Current) and continental air masses from the High Arctic.

The four calendar seasons in Quebec are spring, summer, autumn and winter, with conditions differing by region. They are then differentiated according to the insolation, temperature, and precipitation of snow and rain. In Quebec City, the length of the daily sunshine varies from 8:37 hrs in December to 15:50 hrs in June; the annual variation is much greater (from 4:54 to 19:29 hrs) at the northern tip of the province. From temperate zones to the northern territories of the Far North, the brightness varies with latitude, as well as the Northern Lights and midnight sun.

Quebec is divided into four climatic zones: arctic, subarctic, humid continental and East maritime. In periods of intense heat and cold, temperatures can reach  in the summer and  during the Quebec winter, They may vary depending on the Humidex or Wind chill.

The all-time record of the greatest precipitation in winter was established in winter 2007–2008, with more than five metres of snow in the area of Quebec City, while the average amount received per winter is around three metres. Also, the winter of 2010 was the warmest and driest recorded in more than 60 years.

Climate tables

Wildlife
The province is home to a wide variety of flora and fauna. The birdlife is diverse including Wild Turkey, Meleagris gallopavo, Yellow-bellied Sapsucker, Sphyrapicus varius and Loggerhead Shrike, Lanius ludovicianus.

The large land wildlife is mainly composed of the white-tailed deer, the moose, the muskox, the caribou (reindeer), the American black bear and the polar bear. The average land wildlife includes the cougar, the coyote, the eastern wolf, the bobcat, the Arctic fox, the fox, etc. The small animals seen most commonly include the eastern grey squirrel, the snowshoe hare, the groundhog, the skunk, the raccoon, the chipmunk and the Canadian beaver.

Biodiversity of the estuary and gulf of Saint Lawrence River consists of an aquatic mammal wildlife, of which most goes upriver through the estuary and the Saguenay–St. Lawrence Marine Park until the Île d'Orléans (French for Orleans Island), such as the blue whale, the beluga, the minke whale and the harp seal (earless seal). Among the Nordic marine animals, there are two particularly important to cite: the walrus and the narwhal.

Inland waters are populated by small to large fresh water fish, such as the largemouth bass, the American pickerel, the walleye, the Acipenser oxyrinchus, the muskellunge, the Atlantic cod, the Arctic char, the brook trout, the Microgadus tomcod (tomcod), the Atlantic salmon, the rainbow trout, etc.

Among the birds commonly seen in the southern inhabited part of Quebec, there are the American robin, the house sparrow, the red-winged blackbird, the mallard, the common grackle, the blue jay, the American crow, the black-capped chickadee, some warblers and swallows, the starling and the rock pigeon, the latter two having been introduced in Quebec and are found mainly in urban areas. Avian fauna includes birds of prey like the golden eagle, the peregrine falcon, the snowy owl and the bald eagle. Sea and semi-aquatic birds seen in Quebec are mostly the Canada goose, the double-crested cormorant, the northern gannet, the European herring gull, the great blue heron, the sandhill crane, the Atlantic puffin and the common loon. Many more species of land, maritime or avian wildlife are seen in Quebec, but most of the Quebec-specific species and the most commonly seen species are listed above.

Some livestock have the title of "Québec heritage breed", namely the Canadian horse, the Chantecler chicken and the Canadian cow. Moreover, in addition to food certified as "organic", Charlevoix lamb is the first local Quebec product whose geographical indication is protected. Livestock production also includes the pig breeds Landrace, Duroc and Yorkshire and many breeds of sheep and cattle.

The Wildlife Foundation of Quebec and the Data Centre on Natural Heritage of Quebec (CDPNQ) (French acronym) are the main agencies working with officers for wildlife conservation in Quebec.

Vegetation

Given the geology of the province and its different climates, there is an established number of large areas of vegetation in Quebec. These areas, listed in order from the northernmost to the southernmost are: the tundra, the taiga, the Canadian boreal forest (coniferous), mixed forest and Deciduous forest.

On the edge of the Ungava Bay and Hudson Strait is the tundra, whose flora is limited to a low vegetation of lichen with only less than 50 growing days a year. The tundra covers more than 24% of the area of Quebec. Further south, the climate is conducive to the growth of the Canadian boreal forest, bounded on the north by the taiga.

Not as arid as the tundra, the taiga is associated with the sub-Arctic regions of the Canadian Shield and is characterized by a greater number of both plant (600) and animal (206) species, many of which live there all year. The taiga covers about 20% of the total area of Quebec. The Canadian boreal forest is the northernmost and most abundant of the three forest areas in Quebec that straddle the Canadian Shield and the upper lowlands of the province. Given a warmer climate, the diversity of organisms is also higher, since there are about 850 plant species and 280 vertebrates species. The Canadian boreal forest covers 27% of the area of Quebec. The mixed forest is a transition zone between the Canadian boreal forest and deciduous forest. By virtue of its transient nature, this area contains a diversity of habitats resulting in large numbers of plant (1000) and vertebrates (350) species, despite relatively cool temperatures. The ecozone mixed forest covers 11.5% of the area of Quebec and is characteristic of the Laurentians, the Appalachians and the eastern lowlands forests. The third most northern forest area is characterized by deciduous forests. Because of its climate (average annual temperature of ), it is in this area that one finds the greatest diversity of species, including more than 1600 vascular plants and 440 vertebrates. Its relatively long growing season lasts almost 200 days and its fertile soils make it the centre of agricultural activity and therefore of urbanization of Quebec. Most of Quebec's population lives in this area of vegetation, almost entirely along the banks of the Saint Lawrence. Deciduous forests cover approximately 6.6% of the area of Quebec.

From the Abitibi-Témiscamingue to the North Shore, the forest is composed primarily of conifers such as the balsam fir, the jack pine, the white spruce, the black spruce and the tamarack. Some species of deciduous trees such as the yellow birch appear when the river is approached in the south. The deciduous forest of the Great Lakes–St. Lawrence Lowlands is mostly composed of deciduous species such as the sugar maple, the red maple, the white ash, the American beech, the butternut (white walnut), the American elm, the basswood, the bitternut hickory and the northern red oak as well as some conifers such as the eastern white pine and the northern whitecedar. The distribution areas of the paper birch, the trembling aspen and the mountain ash cover more than half of Quebec territory.

See also

 Ecological regions of Quebec
 Île Rouleau crater
 Manicouagan crater

References